Sharon Bowes (born September 17, 1966 in Windsor, Ontario) is a Canadian sport shooter. She competed in rifle shooting events at the Summer Olympics in 1984, 1988, 1992, and 2000.

Olympic results

References

1966 births
Living people
Sportspeople from Windsor, Ontario
ISSF rifle shooters
Canadian female sport shooters
Shooters at the 1984 Summer Olympics
Shooters at the 1988 Summer Olympics
Shooters at the 1992 Summer Olympics
Shooters at the 2000 Summer Olympics
Olympic shooters of Canada
Shooters at the 1995 Pan American Games
Shooters at the 1999 Pan American Games
Shooters at the 1994 Commonwealth Games
Shooters at the 1998 Commonwealth Games
Shooters at the 2002 Commonwealth Games
Commonwealth Games medallists in shooting
Commonwealth Games gold medallists for Canada
Commonwealth Games silver medallists for Canada
Commonwealth Games bronze medallists for Canada
Pan American Games silver medalists for Canada
Pan American Games medalists in shooting
Shooters at the 2015 Pan American Games
Medalists at the 1995 Pan American Games
Medalists at the 1999 Pan American Games
20th-century Canadian women
21st-century Canadian women
Medallists at the 1994 Commonwealth Games
Medallists at the 1998 Commonwealth Games
Medallists at the 2002 Commonwealth Games